Federal Building and United States Courthouse may refer to:

 Federal Building and United States Courthouse (Albuquerque, New Mexico)
 Federal Building and United States Courthouse (Dothan, Alabama)
Federal Building and U.S. Courthouse (Gainesville, Georgia)
 Federal Building and United States Courthouse (Sioux City, Iowa)
 Federal Building and United States Courthouse (Sioux Falls, South Dakota)
 Federal Building and United States Courthouse (Wheeling, West Virginia, 1907)